Gongzong is a temple name accorded to Chinese royalty. It may refer to:

Emperor An of Han (94–125)
Tuoba Huang (428–451), crown prince of Northern Wei, father of Emperor Wencheng
Emperor Shang of Tang (died 714), honored as Gongzong by the puppet emperor Li Chenghong
Zhu Changxun (1586–1641), prince of the Ming dynasty, father of Zhu Yousong

See also
Emperor Gong (disambiguation)

Temple name disambiguation pages